Mercury Bay is a large V-shaped bay on the eastern coast of the Coromandel Peninsula on the North Island of New Zealand. It was named by the English navigator Captain James Cook during his exploratory expeditions. It was first named Te-Whanganui-a-Hei, the great bay of Hei, by the Māori.

On 9 November 1769 Cook landed on the shores of the bay to observe a Transit of Mercury. In 1919 an area of land around Shakespeare Cliff was set aside, and a small memorial was constructed, based on the erroneous notion that it was the location of Cook's observations. But the actual site of Cook's landing and observation was the eastern end of Cook's Beach, near the Purangi estuary. A smaller memorial plinth was established there also.

The brig Trial and the schooner Brothers were attacked by Māori on 20 August 1815 in Mercury Bay, when several sailors were killed. The bay was the resting place of HMS Buffalo, a ship that transported passengers and prisoners to Australia that was wrecked in a storm in 1840.

The mouth of Mercury Bay is ten kilometres across, and its coastline extends some 20 km. On the shore of the bay is the resort town of Whitianga, and a natural harbour is formed by an arm of the bay which extends inland a further six kilometres southward. Several small islets are located at the southern and northern extremities of the bay, and the Mercury Islands are 10 km to the north. The Whanganui A Hei (Cathedral Cove) Marine Reserve is in the southern part of the bay.

Named locations along Mercury Bay include Buffalo Beach, Wharekaho, Ferry Landing, Shakespeare Cliff, Lonely Bay, Flaxmill Bay, Cooks Beach, Purangi Estuary, Cathedral Cove and Hahei.

Mercury Bay is a good location for game fishing, with the Mercury Bay Game Fishing Club being one of the largest in New Zealand. The bay is also widely known for its yachting. The Mercury Bay Boating Club in Whitianga was the challenging club in New Zealand's first challenge for the America's Cup, in 1987.

References

External links
All About Mercury Bay
Discovering the Mercury Bay

Bays of Waikato
Thames-Coromandel District
Monuments and memorials to James Cook